Diralo Point (‘Nos Diralo’ \'nos di-'ra-lo\) is the rocky point at the southeast extremity of Metlichina Ridge, forming the north side of the entrance to Borima Bay on Oscar II Coast, Graham Land in Antarctica.  It was formed as a result of the disintegration of Larsen Ice Shelf in the area in 2002 and the subsequent retreat of Jorum Glacier.

The feature is named after the settlement of Diralo in southern Bulgaria.

Location

Maps
 Antarctic Digital Database (ADD). Scale 1:250000 topographic map of Antarctica. Scientific Committee on Antarctic Research (SCAR), 1993–2016.

References
 Diralo Point. SCAR Composite Antarctic Gazetteer.
 Bulgarian Antarctic Gazetteer. Antarctic Place-names Commission. (details in Bulgarian, basic data in English)

External links
 Diralo Point. Copernix satellite image

Headlands of Graham Land
Oscar II Coast
Bulgaria and the Antarctic